A Moment to Remember (lit. "Eraser in My Head") is a 2004 South Korean film based on the 2001 Japanese television drama Pure Soul. It stars Son Ye-jin and Jung Woo-sung and follows the theme of discovery in a relationship and the burdens of loss caused by Alzheimer's disease.

The film was released on November 5, 2004, in South Korea. It was a major success domestically, topping the box office for two consecutive weeks to become the 5th highest-grossing film of 2004 at 2,565,078 admissions. The film was also a hit in Japan, breaking previous records of Korean films released there; it was the 19th highest-grossing film at the 2005 Japanese box office.

John H. Lee and Kim Young-ha won Best Adapted Screenplay at the 2005 Grand Bell Awards.

The film was remade in Turkish as Evim Sensin in 2012

Plot 
The first act of the film introduces the protagonists, a woman named Su-jin and a man named Chul-soo. The movie highlights their accidental meeting, followed by their subsequent courting despite their difference in social status that should have kept them apart. Kim Su-jin is a 27-year-old fashion designer, spurned by her lover, a colleague who was also a married man. Depressed, she goes to a convenience store, where she bumps into a tall, handsome man with whom she has a slight misunderstanding. Following that, she returns home and, receiving her father's forgiveness, decides to start life afresh.

One day while accompanying her father, who is the CEO of a construction firm, she coincidentally meets the man whom she earlier bumped into at the convenience store. He is Choi Chul-soo, the construction site's foreman who is studying to become an architect. Though he initially appears like a rough and dirty construction worker, Chul-soo exudes sheer masculinity in its most basic physical form. Su-jin instantly takes a liking to Chul-soo and actively courts him. There are many sweet events that take place in the occurrence of their courtship, eventually leading to their marriage.

The second act follows the couple happily settling into married life, with Chul-soo designing their dream house and Su-jin learning to become a housewife. As time passes, however, Su-jin begins to display forgetfulness, including an incident in which a fire breaks out because of a stove she'd forgotten to turn off. While Chul-soo caught the fire in time, the seriousness of the incident and others like it leads them to seek medical help.

The third act deals with Su-jin's early-onset Alzheimer's disease diagnosis, and the couple's consequent response to it. Su-jin at first experiences denial, then becomes heavily burdened by the knowledge that she will forget her husband. Nevertheless, they make the commitment to stay together and as the disease progresses, the trials the couple go through increase because of Su-jin's deteriorating memory. Finally, Su-jin makes the decision to leave their home and check herself into an assisted facility.

Despite his grief, Chul-soo remains at Su-jin's side even when she doesn't remember him, hiding his eyes behind sunglasses when he visits her so she can't see his tears. At the end of the film, Chul-soo reenacts the first time they met in the convenience store, with all of Su-jin's friends and family there. In the final scene, Su-jin is riding in a car beside her husband at sunset, and he tells her, "I love you."

Cast 

Son Ye-jin as Kim Su-jin
Jung Woo-sung as Choi Chul-soo
Baek Jong-hak as Seo Yeong-min
Lee Seon-jin as Jung An-na
Park Sang-gyu as Mr. Kim
Kim Hee-ryeong as Mother
Seon Ji-hyun as Jeong-eun
Kim Bu-seon as Madam Oh
Kim Joong-ki as Section Chief Cha
Hyun Young as Yu-na
Park Mi-suk as Ji-hyun
Shin Cheol-jin as Manager Park
Jin Yong-ok as construction worker 1
Shin Hyun-tak as construction worker 3
Kwon Byeong-kil as Ph.D. Lee
Oh Kwang-rok as bum at station
Jung Min-sung as passerby on cellphone
Choi Gyo-sik as public officer
David Lee McInnis as model

Remakes 
On October 22, 2008, it was reported that CBS Films had secured the rights for an American remake, with Susannah Grant attached to write the screenplay. After a turnaround, it was announced in February 2013 that Scott Pictures will produce and finance along with Sobini Films and Film 360 with Ben Lewin set to direct and Katherine Heigl has been cast as the female lead. On August 30, 2016, Josh Hartnett was in talks to star in the remake and Jena Malone replaced Heigl.

In the Philippines, on December 14, 2020, it was announced by "The One of Multimedia Alden Richards" on an interview with Philippine Entertainment Portal (PEP.ph) that there will be a Philippine remake of the movie starring him and "New One of the Generations Primetime and Movie Queen Bea Alonzo", the production will start in January 2021 with Nuel Naval as director and GMA Pictures & Viva Films will both producing the film. As of today, shooting of the film started as of November 2021, and the official title of the film was renamed to "Special Memory"

Similar plot
Other works inspired by this film with plots involving the female protagonist diagnosed with Alzheimer's while her husband stands by her, include:
2018 Indian Telugu language film "Padi Padi Leche Manasu"("A heart that keeps rising and falling")
2008 Indian Hindi language film U Me Aur Hum ("You, me, and us")
2011 South Korean television series A Thousand Days' Promise
2012 Turkish film Evim Sensin ("You are my home")
2012 Malaysia Film Selagi Masih Ada
2018 Malaysian Tamil Film 'Neeyum Naanum'

Awards and nominations

References

External links
  
 
 
 

2004 films
2000s Korean-language films
2004 romantic drama films
South Korean romantic drama films
Films about Alzheimer's disease
Films about architecture
Films based on television series
CJ Entertainment films
South Korean films remade in other languages
2000s South Korean films
Films about disability